Tomáš Doležal (born September 29, 1990) is a Czech professional ice hockey centre. He is currently playing for HC ZUBR Přerov of the Chance Liga.

Doležal previously played with HC Slavia Praha and HC Litvínov in the Czech Extraliga.

He was born in Finland while his father Jiří was playing hockey for JYP. His elder brother Jiří Jr was also a professional (both played for Slavia Praha).

References

External links

1990 births
Living people
HC Berounští Medvědi players
Czech ice hockey centres
BK Havlíčkův Brod players
HC Kobra Praha players
HC Litvínov players
HC Most players
HC ZUBR Přerov players
HC Slavia Praha players
HC Stadion Litoměřice players
People from Jyväskylä
Ice hockey people from Prague